The Federation of Trade Unions of Belarus is a trade union centre in Belarus. It has evolved from the Soviet era official unions, but has in recent years been in conflict with the government over issues such as living standards and union interference.

References

General Confederation of Trade Unions
National trade union centers of Belarus
World Federation of Trade Unions